This article contains information about all releases by Turkish pop artist Sezen Aksu.

Albums

MC/LP

MC/CD

Remixes

Live

Singles

45 rpm

MC & CD / Digital

Soundtrack appearances
"Hadi Bakalım" in Cemetery Man (1994)
"Propaganda Cues" in Propaganda (1999)
"İkinci Bahar" in İkinci Bahar (2000)
"Karşı Pencere" and "Şarkı Söylemek Lazım" in La finestra di fronte (Facing Windows) (2003)
"Eğreti Gelin" in Eğreti Gelin (2004)
"Her Şeyi Yak" in Offside (2005)
"Hayat Sana Teşekkür Ederim" in Cuore Sacro (Sacred Heart) (2005)
"İstanbul Hatırası" in Crossing the Bridge: The Sound of Istanbul (2005)
"40" in 40 (2009)
"Kutlama" in Mine Vaganti (Loose Cannons) (2010)
"Yol Arkadaşım" in Die Fremde (When We Leave) (2010)
"Muhabbet Kuşları" in Mahpeyker (2010)
"La Sella Della Prima," "Tenna," "Sude," "Gitmem Daha," and "Unuttun mu Beni?" in Magnifica Presenza (2012)
"İstanbul Yokmuş Bundan Başka" in Turkish TV series Kayıp Şehir (2013)
"Vay", "Olmaz Olsun" in Patron Mutlu Son İstiyor (2014)
"Ben Öyle Birini Sevdim ki" (Delibal Original Soundtrack) (2016)
"İhtimal Ki" (Cebimdeki Yabancı Original Soundtrack) (2018)
"Veda" (Kürk Mantolu Madonna Original Theatre Soundtrack) (2018)

References

Discographies of Turkish artists
Pop music discographies